The Women's scratch at the 2013 UCI Track Cycling World Championships was held on February 22. 18 athletes participated in the contest. The competition consisted of 40 laps, making a total of 10 km.

Medalists

Results
The race was held at 19:15.

References

2013 UCI Track Cycling World Championships
UCI Track Cycling World Championships – Women's scratch
UCI